Juan Ignacio Cavallaro (born 28 June 1994) is an Argentine footballer who plays as a winger for Deportes La Serena.

Honours
San Lorenzo
Argentine Primera División: 2013 Inicial
Copa Libertadores: 2014

References

External links
 

1994 births
Living people
Argentine footballers
Argentine expatriate footballers
Argentina under-20 international footballers
Association football midfielders
People from Paraná, Entre Ríos
Sportspeople from Entre Ríos Province
Unión de Santa Fe footballers
San Lorenzo de Almagro footballers
L.D.U. Quito footballers
Estudiantes de La Plata footballers
Club Atlético Tigre footballers
Deportes La Serena footballers
Argentine Primera División players
Ecuadorian Serie A players
Chilean Primera División players
Expatriate footballers in Chile
Expatriate footballers in Ecuador
Argentine expatriate sportspeople in Chile
Argentine expatriate sportspeople in Ecuador